Pənahlılar (until 2008, Pənahlar, Panakhlar, and Panakhlyar) is a village and municipality in the Goygol Rayon of Azerbaijan.  It has a population of 1,106.

References 

Populated places in Goygol District